Burger Land is an American food reality television series that premiered with two special episodes airing back-to-back on September 2, 2012, on the Travel Channel. The series is hosted by food author/filmmaker and hamburger enthusiast George Motz based on his book Hamburger America. In each episode, Motz travels the country in search of the best burgers that he can find and eats in each state. The first full season premiered on April 15, 2013.

Opening
Introduction (narrated by George Motz):

Episodes

Specials

Season 1 (2013)

References

External links
 
 
 

2012 American television series debuts
2013 American television series endings
2010s American reality television series
English-language television shows
Food travelogue television series
Food reality television series
Travel Channel original programming
Television shows filmed in Wisconsin
Television shows filmed in New Jersey
Television shows filmed in California
Television shows filmed in Florida
Television shows filmed in New Orleans
Television shows filmed in Texas
Television shows filmed in New Mexico
Television shows filmed in Mississippi
Television shows filmed in New York City
Television shows filmed in Tennessee
Television shows filmed in North Carolina
Television shows filmed in Connecticut
Television shows filmed in Illinois